Ashaga-Arkhit is a rural locality (a selo) and the administrative centre of Ashaga-Arkhitsky Selsoviet, Khivsky District, Republic of Dagestan, Russia. The population was 808 as of 2010. There are 21 streets.

Geography 
Ashaga-Arkhit is located 6 km southeast of Khiv (the district's administrative centre) by road. Yukhari-Arkhit is the nearest rural locality.

References 

Rural localities in Khivsky District